The 2014 NCAA Division I Men's Swimming and Diving Championships were contested in March 2014 at the Lee and Joe Jamail Texas Swimming Center at the University of Texas in Austin, Texas at the 80th annual NCAA-sanctioned swim meet to determine the team and individual national champions of Division I men's collegiate swimming and diving in the United States.

California topped the team standings, the Golden Bears' fifth men's title and third in four years.

Team standings
Note: Top 10 only
(H) = Hosts
(DC) = Defending champions
Full results

Swimming results

Diving results

See also
List of college swimming and diving teams

References

NCAA Division I Men's Swimming and Diving Championships
NCAA Division I Swimming And Diving Championships
NCAA Division I Men's Swimming And Diving Championships
NCAA Division I Men's Swimming and Diving Championships